Saint John's Methodist Church is a historic church at S. Ferguson Street in Stamford, Texas.

It was built in 1910 and added to the National Register in 1986.

See also

National Register of Historic Places listings in Jones County, Texas
Recorded Texas Historic Landmarks in Jones County

References

Methodist churches in Texas
Churches on the National Register of Historic Places in Texas
Prairie School architecture in Texas
Churches completed in 1910
Buildings and structures in Jones County, Texas
National Register of Historic Places in Jones County, Texas
Recorded Texas Historic Landmarks